Nye Borgerlige (in English often translated as the New Right) is a national-conservative and right-wing populist Danish political party. The party was founded in the autumn 2015 by Pernille Vermund and Peter Seier Christensen. It entered the Folketing for the first time at the 2019 general election with four seats (out of 175 in Denmark proper) and again at the 2022 general election with six. In 2023, Lars Boje Mathiesen took over as party leader but was expelled from the party later that year. The party currently hold three seats and is without a leader.

History

Vermund leadership

Formation and time prior to entring Parliament: 2015–2019 

On 24 September 2015, Pernille Vermund and Peter Seier Christensen, both former members of the Conservative People's Party, announced that they were in the process of establishing a new party under the working title  (We Conservative(s))  but choose to use the word borgerlig to differentiate themselves from the Conservatives.

The party was officially founded on 19 October 2015 under the name Nye Borgerlige.

On the 21st of September 2016, the party announced that it had gathered the 20,109 signatures required to run in the up-coming general election which turned out to be in June 2019. This eligibility  was confirmed by the Minister of the Interior on 6 October where the party received the election letter "D".

After the establishment of the party, municipal council members in several municipalities switched from their original parties to Nye Borgerlige. Most of these were lost in the Danish local elections of 2017, where the party only gained one seat in the municipal council of Hillerød Municipality.

2019–2023: Opposition to Frederiksen I and II 
At the 2019 general election was to be called at the party reached 2.4% of the votes, equal to four seats, whereby Nye Borgerlige for the first time reached represented in the Folketing with its first parliamentary group consisting of Pernille Vermund, Peter Seier Christensen, Mette Thiesen, and Lars Boje Mathiesen. During its period in Parliament as an opposition party to the social democratic minority government, Nye Borgerlige gained popularity and became well known for their successful social media strategy in February 2021 becoming Danish party with third most members succeeded by the Social Democrats and Venstre hitting 18,000 members. The same month the party got its highest opinion poll to date suggesting 11% with journalist Lea Korsgaard describing the party as a "cultural phenomenon" in July the same year. The 2021 local elections resulted in a nationwide performance of 3.6% awaring the party 63 seats from the precious single one. Despite this, the party's popularity dwindled especially following the launch of the right-wing-populist party named Denmark Democrats with party leader Inger Støjberg. In the 2022 Danish European Union opt-out referendum Nye Borgerlige campaigned for a no with the result being a yes.
At the 2022 general election in November the party received 3.7 of the popular vote accounting to six seats with the four original MPs being re-elected as well as Mikkel Bjørn Sørensen and Kim Edberg Andersen, although Mette Thiesen left the party the same month as the election due to personal issues and would later join Danish People's Party on 6 February 2023. After the election the party dismissed its though seven years press secretary, Lars Kaaber.
On 10 January 2023, Pernille Vermund announced that she would step down as leader at the party's next national convention in October or before if the NB's central committee (hovedbestyrelse) choose to call for an extraordinary national convention before that where a new leader would be elected. She added that she would continue as an MP for the remainder of the election period. In her resignation statement she wrote:

Before anyone had announced their intention to run, several news media predicted Mikkel Bjørn Sørensen alongside Lars Boje Mathiesen to be the two main contesters in the leadership election, although neither had announced their intention to run. On an extraordinary central committee meeting on 17 January, it was decided that the new leader would be elected on an extraordinary annual meeting held on 7 February as well as Boje Mathiesen announcing his candidacy. On 24 January 2023, which was the deadline for announcing one's candidacy, Mikkel Bjørn Sørensen left Nye Borgerlige and immediately joined Danish People's Party attributing internal dissagrements and a lack of belief in Boje's abilities to lead as the reason. The following day, it was announced that no other candidate than Boje had entered the race whereby he subsequently took office on 7 February 2023 with Henriette Ergemann as his political deputy leader.

Boje leadership: February–March 2023 

On 20 February Ergemann resigned after controversy regarding past comments about i.a. having claimed to experience vaginal bleedings when exposed to people vaccinated with COVID-19 vaccines and accusing former minister Karen Hækkerup of "murder on innocent children" for her participation in vaccinating children for COVID-19. The resignation followed a larger discussion about Boje moving the party line away from conservatism toward a more anarchist and non-pragmatic position with appeal to conspiratorial and anti-establishment sentiments. Nye Borgerlige is expected to continue without a deputy leader until its ordinary annual meeting in October 2023. On March 6, Ergemann left the party.

Joint central committee leadership 
On 10 March, it was announced that the central committee of Nye Borgerlige had unanimously chosen to expel party leader Lars Boje Mathiesen from the party. The reason being that Boje had requried 350,000 kroner withdrawn from a party account to his private account before 10 March as well as entering into a four-year non-cancellable contract with the party securing him a leader remuneration of 55,000 kroner per month incl. pension. If these critaria were not met, he expresed that he would leave the party. On 10 March, Pernille Vermund stated that she was willing to once again take over as party leader. On 13 March, Vermund withdrew her former pledge not to run in the next general election. The party is led jointly central committee until a new leader is elected.

Platform 

Nye Borgerlige does not consider itself to be ideologic bound but defines itself by virtue of its conservative standpoint as a party, that "take[s] starting point in the given and want to develop society based on knowledge and experience rather than revolutionising based on the backgrounds of faith and ideology". The party supports Denmark leaving the European Union and combines according to their party program "a classical conservative value-based policy with a borgerlig economic policy and an unambiguous resistance towards conventions and supranational agreements limiting Danish democracy". With this combination the party is located on the right of the political spectrum regarding both the distribution and value dimension.

The party has been described as national conservative, national liberal, right-wing populist and as nationalist. Nye Borgerlige is libertarian on economical issues and is against immigration and was additionally called anti-Islam.

The parties five main principles are:

 A strong cultural community of values
 Less state, more human
 Commons responsibility for society's weakest
 Reasonable protection of natural values
 Freedom, democracy, and national sovereignty

Youth wing 
Nye Borgerliges Ungdom (NBU) (Nye Borgerlige's Youth) is the official youth wing of Nye Borgerlige and decribes it self as a borgerlig youth party based on classical, conservative values. The leader of the youth party is according to Nye Borgerlige's articles of association represented in its main board.

Following MP Mikkel Bjørn Sørensen's depature from the party on 24 January 2023, the very same day, both the leader Malte Larsen and deputy leader Mitchel Oliver Vestergaard of NBU decided to leave both organisations. Both Larsen and Vestergaard would later also join the DF during February 2023. On 24 February 2023, Tenna Røberg was elected new youth leader.

Election results

Parliament (Folketing)

Local elections

Party leadership

Notes

References

General references

External links 
 Official website

New Right
New Right
New Right
Political parties established in 2015
2015 establishments in Denmark
New Right
New Right
New Right
New Right
Right-wing populism in Denmark